John Almond (1537 – 18 April 1585) was a Cistercian monk. He is commemorated as a Confessor of the Faith in the Roman Catholic Church, and his name has been included in the supplementary process of the English Martyrs.

He came from Cheshire, and was a monk in the time of Henry VIII, but neither his abbey nor his fate during and after its suppression have been identified.

He died in prison at Hull Castle on 18 April 1585, having been imprisoned there since 1579.

Notes

1537 births
1585 deaths
People from Cheshire
English people who died in prison custody
16th-century Roman Catholics
Year of birth unknown
English Cistercians
16th-century English clergy